The 2004 European Archery Championships is  the 18th edition of the European Archery Championships. The event was held in Brussels, Belgium from 17 to 22 May, 2004.

Medal table

Medal summary

Recurve

Compound

References

External links
 Results

European Archery Championships
2004 in archery
International sports competitions hosted by Belgium
2004 in European sport